is a Studio Ghibli animator who is famous for Howl's Moving Castle and Giant Robo (OVA).

As a character designer
 Urotsukidōji (1987-1994)
 Relic Armor Legaciam (1987)
 Giant Robo (1992-1994) (with Toshiyuki Kubooka)
 Wonder Project J2: Corlo no Mori no Josette (1996)
 Princess Nine (1998)
 Strange Dawn (2000)
 Howl's Moving Castle (2004)
 Tide Line Blue (2005)
 Zegapain (2006)
 Tales from Earthsea (2006)
 The Secret World of Arrietty (2010)
 Mary and the Witch's Flower (2017)
 Cagaster of an Insect Cage (2020)

As a director
A Sumo Wrestler's Tail (Ghibli Museum Short) (2010)
 Modest Heroes (2018)

External links
 

Studio Ghibli people
Anime character designers
Sunrise (company) people
Japanese animators
1966 births
Living people
People from Kurashiki